Ransom Stephens is an American scientist and author.

Professional life

As a particle physicist, Ransom Stephens worked on experiments at SLAC, Fermilab (DØ), CERN (ATLAS), and Cornell (CLEO), discovered a new type of matter, and worked on the team that discovered the Top quark. During the tech boom that ended in 2001, he directed patent development for a wireless web startup, and later became an expert on timing noise. His specialty at this time was the analysis of electrodynamics in high-rate digital systems.

His novel, The God Patent, makes use of Stephens's experience as a physicist, patent director, public speaker and single father. The novel includes a character loosely based on the physicist Emmy Noether.

Works

References

External links 
 Ransom Stephens's website
 OpenDemocracy article on the future of publishing
 Vampire Wire interview with Ransom Stephens
 The Institute

21st-century American novelists
American male novelists
American technology writers
Living people
21st-century American male writers
21st-century American non-fiction writers
American male non-fiction writers
Year of birth missing (living people)
People associated with CERN